Suddenly, It's Spring (some sources list the title without a comma) is a 1947 comedy film directed by Mitchell Leisen. It stars Paulette Goddard and Fred MacMurray.

The story is set in 1945, at the end of World War II. Goddard and MacMurray play a married couple seeing other again after both served in the military. When they parted, they were planning to divorce, but they never went through with it. Now reunited, they must decide if the marriage should end. Meanwhile, another woman considers herself betrothed to the husband, and a friend of the husband has romantic designs on the wife.

Plot

Cast

Paulette Goddard as Mary Morely
Fred MacMurray as Peter Morely
Macdonald Carey as Jack Lindsay
Arleen Whelan as Gloria Fay
Lillian Fontaine as Mary's Mother
Frank Faylen as Harold Michaels
Frances Robinson as WAC Capt. Rogers
Victoria Horne as WAC Lt. Billings
Georgia Backus as WAC Maj. Cheever
Jean Ruth as WAC Cpl. Michaels
Roberta Jonay as WAC Sergeant
Willie Best as Porter on Train
Emory Parnell as Elevator Passenger

Radio adaptation
Suddenly, It's Spring was presented on Stars in the Air February 21, 1952. The 30-minute adaptation starred Betty Hutton and Macdonald Carey.

References

External links

1947 films
1947 romantic comedy films
American romantic comedy films
American black-and-white films
Comedy of remarriage films
Films scored by Victor Young
Films directed by Mitchell Leisen
Paramount Pictures films
1940s English-language films
1940s American films